The year 1612 in music involved some significant events.

Events 
July – Claudio Monteverdi is dismissed from his post at the court of Mantua by the new duke Francesco IV Gonzaga.
October 28 – John Dowland is appointed to a special post at the court of King James I of England.
December – The death of Francesco Gonzaga, Duke of Mantua, fails to bring a recall to court for Claudio Monteverdi.

Publications 
Adriano Banchieri – , Op. 26 (Venice: Ricciardo Amadino), a collection for four instruments
Antonio Brunelli –  (Meadow of sacred musical flowers) for one voice and eight voices with continuo, Op. 7 (Venice: Giacomo Vincenti)
Sethus Calvisius –  book two (Leipzig: Jacob Apel), an expanded edition of book one from 1599
Antonio Cifra – Fifth book of motets for two, three, and four voices, Op. 11 (Rome: Giovanni Battista Robletti)
William Corkine – The second book of ayres, some, to sing and play to the base-violl alone: others, to be sung to the lute and base violl (London: Matthew Lownes, John Brown, Thomas Snodham for William Barley), also includes pieces for the lyra viol
Giovanni Croce –  for three, five, and six voices with a four-part ripieno (Venice: Giacomo Vincenti)
Ignazio Donati –  for one, two, three, four, and five voices (Venice: Giacomo Vincenti)
John Dowland – A Pilgrimes solace for three, four, and five voices (London: Matthew Lownes, John Brown, Thomas Snodham for William Barley)
Giacomo Finetti –  for four voices with organ bass (Venice: Angelo Gardano)
Melchior Franck
 for five voices (Coburg: Justus Hauck), a wedding song
 (Musical Sigh) for four voices (Coburg: Justus Hauck), a collection of motets
Bartholomäus Gesius –  for five voices (Brieg), a graduation song
Orlando Gibbons – The First Set Of Madrigals and Motetts of 5. Parts: apt for Viols and Voyces (London: Thomas Snodham for William Barley)
Hans Leo Hassler – Sacri concentus Book 2, published in Augsburg.
Joachim van den Hove –  (Utrecht: Salomon de Roy & Johannes Guilielmus de Rhenen), a collection of lute music
Giovanni Girolamo Kapsberger
Claude Le Jeune – Second  (Paris: Pierre Ballard), a collection of chansons, published posthumously
Simone Molinaro – Concerti for one and two voices (Milan: Simon Tini & Francesco Lomazzo)
Giovanni Bernardino Nanino
Third book of motets for one, two, three, four, and five voices with organ bass (Rome: Bartolomeo Zannetti for Christophoro Margarina)
Third book of madrigals for five voices (Rome: Bartolomeo Zannetti)
Pietro Pace – Second book of madrigals for five voices (Venice, Giacomo Vincenti)
Benedetto Pallavicino – Eighth book of madrigals for five voices (Venice: Ricciardo Amadino), published posthumously
Tomaso Pecci - Second book of madrigals for five voices (Venice: Angelo Gardano), published posthumously
Peter Philips – Cantiones Sacrae Quinis Vocibus (Antwerp: Pierre Phalèse)
Michael Praetorius – Terpsichore, a set of Renaissance dances.
probable
Parthenia, a collection of keyboard music by William Byrd, John Bull, and Orlando Gibbons

Opera 
none recorded

Births 
date unknown 
Wolfgang Ebner, organist and court composer (died 1665)
John Hingston, organist, viol player and composer (died 1683)
Vincenzo Tozzi, opera composer (died  1679)

Deaths 
June 8 – Hans Leo Hassler, German composer (born 1564)
August 12 – Giovanni Gabrieli, composer and organist (born c.1555)
September – Giovanni de' Bardi, writer and composer (born 1534)
September 24 – Johannes Lippius, theologian, philosopher, composer, and music theorist (born 1585)
date unknown
Ercole Bottrigari, writer and composer (born 1531)
Tomasz Szadek, Polish composer and singer (born 1550)

References

 
Music
17th century in music
Music by year